Miguel Torres may refer to:

Miguel Torres (actor) (1926–1962), Brazilian footballer, writer, and actor
Miguel A. Torres (born 1941), president of Bodegas Torres
Miguel Torres (swimmer) (born 1946), Spanish swimmer
Miguel Torres (fighter) (born 1981), American mixed martial artist
Miguel Torres (footballer, born 1982), Peruvian footballer
Miguel Torres (footballer, born 1986), Spanish footballer
Miguel Torres Díaz, Secretary of Transportation and Public Works of Puerto Rico